Jaime Bayly Letts  (born February 19, 1965) is a Peruvian writer, journalist and television personality.

He has won an Emmy Award and two of his books have been adapted into international movies.

Early life
Bayly was born to an upper class Peruvian family. He was the first son and the third of eleven children of Jaime Bayly Llona and his wife, Doris Letts Colmenares. He is the nephew of Walter Bayly Llona, CEO of Credicorp.

He studied at Markham College, a British private school in Lima, and later at Colegio San Agustín of Lima. In his youth, he was convinced by his mother to work at the daily newspaper La Prensa of Lima in order to become more responsible through a part-time job.

In 1982 he was accepted to the Pontificia Universidad Católica del Perú. After studying for four years, he had to leave the university as he could not pass a mandatory subject.

Career
His first television appearance was in 1983 during Peru's municipal elections, interviewing candidates and politicians. Later on, he began a career as a late show host interviewing celebrities.

Bayly's first late-night show, 1990 en America, got the attention of TV audiences and critics. The following year he hosted a copy of David Letterman's Late Show called ¿Qué hay de nuevo?.

During the 1990s Bayly hosted late-night shows in the United States at CBS Telenoticias Network Latin America and Telemundo for six years.

After President of Peru Alberto Fujimori sought asylum in Japan in 2001 following a ten-year term in order to avoid prosecution on charges of corruption, independent news media found itself in a better position. Bayly was able to host political program El Francotirador ("The Sniper"), interviewing candidates to the 2001 presidential election. In that program, he apparently offended several personalities with his political opinions, and finally had to quit. Inspired by the experience, Bayly wrote a book, taking the title from the show. Later he resumed the program.

In 2006, he supported right-wing Lourdes Flores for presidency. In 2010, Bayly announced he intended to run for president in the 2011 Peruvian general election to succeed Alan García. Later that year, he supported leftist candidate Susana Villaran in her successful campaign to become mayor of Lima. As a consequence, broadcasting company Frecuencia Latina cancelled his show.

On his U.S. program which airs on the Miami-based MegaTV channel, Bayly is well known for his views which have included sharp criticism of the Venezuelan government of Hugo Chávez and Nicolás Maduro.

Run for the Presidency
Bayly returned to Peru in July 2013 for an interview hosted by Jaime de Althaus in his program of Channel N (8). In the interview, he made a statement that he will run for the Presidency under the banner of the party Popular Action. In 2011, he intended to run under various parties like the Christian People's Party.

Awards
 Suncoast Regional EMMY® - On Camera Talent – Commentator/Editorialist - 2008 - (Bayly) - Winner
 GLAAD Media Visibilidad - 2007
 Planeta de Novela - 2005 - (Y De Repente Un Angel) - Runner-up
 Herralde de Novela - 1997 - (La Noche Es Virgen) - Winner

Bibliography

His novel No se lo Digas a Nadie (Don't Tell Anyone) inspired a screenplay for a film of the same title (1998), directed by Francisco Lombardi, and starring Santiago Magill and Christian Meier. He wrote other novels, all of them on politics, sexual freedom and friendship. Several of his books contain recurring semi-autobiographical elements (e.g. bisexual cocaine using Peruvian newscaster who moves to Miami). The character for "El Cojo" is supposedly based on his father who was also crippled. His characters are often heartless, and reflect moral ambivalence, which makes it difficult to identify with them. In 2018, he publishes Pecho Frío, a work where humor, autobiographical references and reflection on the sexual identity of men are combined.

Novels 
 No se lo Digas a Nadie, 1994 (Don't Tell Anyone); film by Francisco Lombardi in 1998.
Fue Ayer y No Me Acuerdo 1995 (It Was Yesterday, I Don't Remember It) 
Los últimos días de 'La Prensa''', 1996 (The Last Days of La Prensa)La Noche es Virgen, 1997 (The Night Is Virgin);  Winner of the Herralde de Novela AwardYo Amo a Mi Mami, 1999 (I Love My Mommy)Los Amigos que Perdí, 2000 (The Friends I Lost)Aquí no hay Poesía, 2001 (There Is No Poetry Here) La mujer de mi hermano 2002 (My Brother's Wife); film by Ricardo de Montreuil in 2005.El Huracán Lleva tu Nombre, 2004 (The Hurricane Has Your Name)Y de Repente, Un Ángel, 2005 (Suddenly, An Angel), finalist of Premio PlanetaEl Canalla Sentimental, 2008 (The Sentimental Jerk) El Cojo y el Loco, 2009 (The Crippled and the Crazy)Morirás Mañana: El Escritor Sale a Matar, 2010 (You Will Die Tomorrow: Writer Sets Out to Kill) Morirás mañana 2: El misterio de Alma Rossi, 2011 (You Will Die Tomorrow: The Mystery of Alma Rossi, Volume 2)Morirás mañana 3: Escupirán sobre mi tumba, 2012 (You Will Die Tomorrow: They'll Spit on my Grave, Volume 3)
 La lluvia del tiempo, 2014 (The Rain of Time)
 El niño terrible y la escritora maldita, 2016
 Pecho frío, 2018

Short-stories 
 Yo soy una señora, 2019

 Poetry 
 2001 - Aquí no hay poesía, poemario, Anagrama

Chronicles
 2002 - El francotirador, crónica periodística;  Empresa Periodística Nacional, diario Ojo'', Lima

References

External links

Jaime Bayly in NTN24 from Bogotá, Colombia – November 2009

1965 births
Bisexual writers
Bisexual men
Peruvian LGBT writers
Living people
People from Lima
Peruvian agnostics
Peruvian journalists
Male journalists
Peruvian male writers
Peruvian people of British descent
Peruvian emigrants to the United States